Abdul-Latif Arabiyat (died 26 April 2019) was a Jordanian politician who served as Speaker of the House of Representatives from 1990 to 1993.

References

Date of birth missing
2019 deaths
Jordanian politicians
Speakers of the House of Representatives (Jordan)
Academic staff of Palestine Technical University